Nyngan Parish is a civil parish of Robinson County, a cadastral division of New South Wales. It is located on Yanda Creek and the Kidman Way north east of Cobar, New South Wales.

It is west of the town of Nyngan, New South Wales.

References

Parishes of New South Wales